Chlorosilanes are a group of reactive, chlorine-containing chemical compounds, related to silane and used in many chemical processes. Each such chemical has at least one silicon-chlorine bond. Trichlorosilane is produced on the largest scale. The parent chlorosilane is silicon tetrachloride.

Synthesis

Hydrochlorosilanes
These include chlorosilane (H3SiCl), dichlorosilane (H2SiCl2), trichlorosilane(HSiCl3), tetrachlorosilane (SiCl4).

They are prepared by the Müller-Rochow process, which involves treating silicon with hydrogen chloride at elevated temperatures in the presence of a copper catalyst. The idealized equation is
2 Si + 6 HCl → 2 HSiCl3 + 2 H2, 
Trichlorosilane (HSiCl3) is the main product; dichlorosilane (H2SiCl2) and silicon tetrachloride (SiCl4) are obtained as byproducts. The process was independently discovered by Eugene G. Rochow and Richard Müller in 1940.

Methylchlorosilanes
Methyltrichlorosilane (CH3SiCl3), dimethyldichlorosilane ((CH3)2SiCl2), and trimethylsilyl chloride ((CH3)3SiCl) are produced by the direct process. They are key reagents in organosilicon chemistry.

Reactions
Hydrochlorosilanes can't be hydrolized.

The methylchlorosilanes react with water to produce hydrogen chloride, giving siloxanes and eventually silicon dioxide. In the case of trimethylsilyl chloride, the hydrolyzed product is hexamethyldisiloxane:
2 ((CH3)3SiCl + H2O → [(CH3)3Si]2O + 2 HCl
The analogous reaction of dimethyldichlorosilane gives siloxane polymers or rings:
 n (CH3)2SiCl2 + n H2O → [(CH3)2SiO]n + 2n HCl

Use
Silicon tetrachloride and trichlorosilane are intermediates in the production of ultrapure silicon in the semiconductor industry. Chlorosilanes obtained from crude silicon are purified by fractional distillation techniques and then reduced with hydrogen to give silicon of  purity.

Organic chlorosilanes are frequently used as coatings for silicon and glass surfaces, and in the production of silicone (polysiloxane) polymers. While phenyl chlorosilanes and many others can be used, methylsiloxanes are produced in the greatest quantities.

Methyl chlorosilanes have one to three methyl groups. In the case of dimethyldichlorosilane, two chlorine atoms are available, so that a reaction with excess water produces a linear chain of ether-like linkages between silicon atoms. As in polyethers, these flexible linkages produce a rubbery polymer, polydimethylsiloxane (PDMS). Methyltrichlorosilane can be used to induce branching and cross-linking in PDMS molecules, while chlorotrimethylsilane serves to end backbone chains, limiting molecular weight.

Other acid-forming species, especially acetate, can replace chlorine in silicone synthesis with little difference in the chemistry of the finished polymer. These analogues of chlorosilanes are quite common in the sealants and adhesives marketed to consumers, and as precursors for medical-grade silicone, because of reduced toxicity.

References